Bulgasari is a lost 1962 South Korean film by Kim Myeong-je.

Bulgasari or Pulgasari may also refer to:

 Pulgasari, a 1985 North Korean film by Shin Sang-ok, which is a remake of the 1962 film
 Pulgasari, a legendary creature that appears in Korean mythology and folklore
 Bulgasari, a character from the South Korean television series Tale of the Nine Tailed

Other uses 
 Bulgasal: Immortal Souls, a South Korean television series